A news bureau is an office for gathering or distributing news. Similar terms are used for specialized bureaus, often to indicate a geographic location or scope of coverage: a ‘Tokyo bureau’ refers to a given news operation's office in Tokyo; 'foreign bureau' is a generic term for a news office set up in a country other than the primary operations center; a ‘Washington bureau’ is an office, typically located in Washington, D.C., that covers news related to national politics in the United States. The person in charge of a news bureau is often called the bureau chief.

The term is distinct from a news desk, which refers to the editorial function of assigning reporters and other staff, and otherwise coordinating, news stories, and sometimes the physical desk where that occurs, but without regard to the geographic location or overall operation of the news organization. For example, a foreign bureau is located in a foreign country and refers to all creative and administrative operations that take place there, whereas a foreign desk describes only editorial functions and may be located anywhere, possibly as an organizational unit within the news organization's home office.

Operation of news bureaus
A news bureau is traditionally operated out of an office by a single news outlet such as a radio, television, or newspaper news program. A single news company such as CNN or NPR may use a single bureau and office staff for all of its programs, and even those of subsidiary or other affiliated companies. For convenience, to save money and space, and to ensure the availability of necessary services (such as video feeds and studios), different companies may share an office space or co-locate at a single office building. News agencies may also operate news bureaus, and major public relations sources (such as governments, large companies, or advocacy groups) may operate news bureaus of their own to create, rather than simply report, news stories.

History of news bureaus

Decline

Traditional news media, particularly television news and newspapers, have cut the number and size of news bureaus in recent decades for several reasons. They face declining profitability due to increasing competition from Internet news sources, and therefore have less money to spend on news-gathering.

Newspapers rely increasingly on cooperative arrangements with counterparts elsewhere and often will accept stories from their sister organizations rather than investigating stories themselves. Similarly, smaller newspapers may formally affiliate to sponsor cooperative bureaus that operate as press pools to serve more than one news organization (and sometimes a large number of organizations) from a single office. When news sources combine operations following a merger or other business consolidation, the surviving company often combines or eliminates redundant bureaus. Growing multiculturalism has facilitated this process: rather than demanding a reporter from their own country or locale who has been sent on assignment, news audiences have come to tolerate or even expect to see stories in remote locations covered by people who live locally; this empowers the audience to make their own judgments about any apparent cultural difference between themselves and the news subjects, rather than leaving the function of cultural interpretation entirely up to the reporter.

The often-criticized practice of parachute journalism allows news media to cover stories remotely using journalists who are generalists rather than more specialized field experts. Rather than leaving journalists in place waiting for breaking news to occur, smaller staff can be assigned as needed to wherever there are breaking stories, either by commuting to the physical location or by synthesizing reports from remote sources. An even more controversial practice, sometimes described as a reaction to declining resources rather than a legitimate cost-saving measure, is to rely on and reprint information from press releases written by public relations professionals working for people or companies that are the subject of an article, or have an interest in an article, without spending the resources to verify or conduct independent research on the matter. Another practice that limits news bureaus is embedded reporting, whereby war correspondents travel under the care of military units rather than at their own direction. The ability to quickly and safely travel throughout a war zone, and to obtain interviews with soldiers and coverage of important conflicts, appeals to news media, but at the cost of journalistic independence and, according to some, objectivity.

Nontraditional bureaus

The interaction between professional journalists, witnesses, and news subjects has evolved considerably. Whereas news subjects and bystanders were once treated simply as witnesses to be interviewed for a news story, the media have now accepted them as part of the news process. There are many antecedents to citizen journalism. For example, meteorologists would count on amateurs to gather weather data to report, or interview willing subjects unrelated to a news story for "man on the street" interviews. As early as the 1930s the Soviet Union encouraged millions of amateur People's correspondents to expose corruption and otherwise report on the news. 

Beginning in the 1970s, media, unable to respond quickly enough to obtain compelling coverage of natural disasters and weather phenomena such as tornadoes would count on hobbyists for photographs and film footage. With improvements in technology and as video cameras and video-equipped cell phones became widely available, they set up formal programs to gather material from nonprofessionals. For example, in August 2006, CNN launched "CNN Exchange", by which the public is encouraged to submit "I-Reports" comprising photographs, videos, or news accounts. More recently newspapers have incorporated blogs, once seen as a threat to conventional news practice, either by creating blogs of their own (and deputizing local or field-specific bloggers as a second, lower-paid tier among their recognized staff of independent contractors) or by covering blogs as news sources.

In 2006, Reuters opened its first virtual news Bureau, staffing real-life reporters in a virtual office in Second Life. CNN followed suit in October 2007, but took a citizen journalism approach, allowing residents of Second Life to submit their own reportage. Although the news audience of Second World is relatively small, and declining, media consider it a training ground for themselves and participants, applicable to future virtual news projects.

References

External links
CNN exchange - official site
second life at Reuters

News